Kristina Mladenovic and Lucie Šafářová were the defending champions, but Mladenovic chose not to participate this year. Šafářová played alongside Květa Peschke, but they lost in the first round to Chan Hao-ching and Chan Yung-jan.

Anabel Medina Garrigues and Yaroslava Shvedova won the tournament, defeating the Chan sisters in the final, 7–6(7–4), 6–2.

Seeds

Draw

External links 
 Draw

Family Circle Cup - Doubles
Charleston Open